Lower mythology is a sphere of mythological representations relating to characters who have no divine status, demons and spirits, as opposed to higher gods and the official cult. This opposition is particularly pronounced in world religions.

History of the study 
The term was introduced by German ethnographer W. Mannhardt, who was the first to carry out a special study of this mythology. Mannhardt extensively studied mostly representations of spirits associated with the harvest and the broader category, spirits of vegetation, representing the annual cycle of dying and resurrecting vegetation. В. Wundt believed that representations of "vegetation demons" were an intermediate stage between the pre-earthly "totemic cult" and developed cults of gods. James George Frazer considered gods such as Attis, Adonis, Osiris, and Dionysus as related through transitional stages to the dying and resurrecting spirit of vegetation.

At an early stage in the development of mythological ideas, scholars suggest the existence of mythological fetishism, within which things and phenomena were animated and social functions were transferred to them. The demonic being was not at all detached from the object in which it was believed to dwell. Later, as a result of the development of a productive economy, mythology moved towards animism, when the "idea" of the thing and the magical power of the demon began to be separated from the thing itself. The original animism included the idea of the demon as a force determining a person's fate, evil or less often beneficent. In Homer there are many examples of a nameless, faceless, suddenly acting and terrifying demon. Of this instantly arising and just as instantly departing fatal force man has no idea, they cannot call it by name and cannot enter into communion with it. Subsequently, there are ideas of demons of individual things and events with different powers of influence. In developed animism the transformation of a demon or god leads to its anthropomorphism, humanization.

Mythology can stratify in relation to the social class. Tales and poems about gods and heroes considered ancestors of aristocratic families are formed. Specific priestly mythology may also be developed in closed corporations of priests. Both types of mythologies constitute a higher, often official mythology. Folk beliefs, an inferior mythology, characterised as coarser and more immediate, but the most stable, has survived longer. In the folklore and beliefs of the peoples of Europe, it is the lower mythology that has survived. The higher mythology has almost completely disappeared and has only partially merged with the images of Christian saints.

Distinction from higher mythology 
Characters of lower mythology often take an active part in people's lives, meeting them, transforming into humans, etc. So, in many mythologies, these characters are more important than the deities who acted, usually during the creation mythic time.

The creatures of inferior mythology are most often characters in the most popular folklore genres: fairy tales, Bailichka and others, while the gods are represented in mythological narratives proper.

In the realm of ritual, the creatures of lower mythology are associated with a complex of superstitions, witchcraft, magic practices and rites, deities - with a tribal or nationwide cult. Mikhail Bakhtin called the folk carnival tradition, which uses images of folk mythology, unofficial, as opposed to the official cult of gods. V. V. Ivanov referred to folk mythology itself by the same term.

The distinction between unofficial inferior mythology and official cult is most pronounced in cases where these mythological systems have historically or ethnically different origins. Such a situation is observed, for example, in the regions where Buddhism spread (Sri Lanka, Tibet, Mongolia) and Christianity, where the latter spread relatively late and absorbed a set of local mythologies (countries of Latin America, etc.).

Thus, an inferior mythology may be formed by downgrading mythological characters of higher ranks to its level. In a number of cases, this is reflected in mythological narratives. In one of the stories of Keti mythology, the supreme god Es expels his wife Hosedem, to earth and she gradually acquires the features of an inferior spirit.

Many beings of lower mythology are associated with a shamanic cult: spirits of body parts used in healing rituals, spirit-masters, spirits-helpers. In regions where there is developed shamanism, like Siberia and South Asia, these spirits are believed to be subordinate to higher deities, with whom the shaman also communicates. In some Asian, Siberian, and Amerindian traditions, unlike the shaman, only the sorcerer could communicate with beings of lower mythology. A typologically similar situation also took place in a number of traditions of the Ancient East. According to anatolian cuneiform texts of the 2nd millennium BC, a priestess, when performing magic acts, in particular healing rituals, referred only to the characters of lower mythology. The priests of the official cult referred to a "thousand gods" of the Hittite kingdom. According to the will of the Hittite king Hattusili I, the queen was forbidden to address the priestesses (unofficial).

In ancient mythologies, acts like cannibalism and human sacrifice were practiced in the name of gods (the cult of Zeus Lykaios,  Dionysus, Celtic mythology, Polynesian cults, etc.). In the process of spreading the ban on cannibalism, it has been increasingly associated with the lower world of monsters, giants, witches, etc.

Characters 
Characters of lower mythology include spirits of nature (forest, mountain, river, sea), spirits associated with farming, the fertility of the earth, spirits of vegetation, personifications of calendar festivals (Slavic Yarilo, German, Italian Befana, etc.), images of pagan gods — downgraded in unofficial folk tradition and replaced by saints (patrons of fertility, Russian The Veles, Saint Blaise, Mokosh, Paraskeva Friday, etc.), various evil spirits (unclean force) in many traditions are attributed to fallen angels, and others.

In descriptions of various mythological traditions, the term demon is often used, borrowed from Greek and European mythology. The word is used to designate supernatural beings who are placed lower in the hierarchy than the gods or who are at the lowest level of the mythological system. In a narrower and more precise sense, demons are called evil spirits.

Often the characters of lower mythology are real animals, although they are often characters of higher levels up to pantheon. At the lower mythological levels they are presented as spirits - patrons of various natural locations: forests, fields, mountains, gorges, rivers, lakes, seas, marshes, etc. and as an evil entity hostile to people. Thus, the cat figures as an embodiment (or assistant, member of the entourage) of chort, an unclean force. The Quechua Indians have a belief of a special evil spirit of the cat, from which warlocks borrow power. In Japanese tradition, the cat was regarded as an evil entity. A number of traditions attribute characteristics of vampirism to the cat. In contrast, the Chinese believe in its ability to dispel evil spirits. In Europe, the cat has been steadily associated with the forces of evil, particularly seen as an attribute of lust or as a symbol of the shamed Satan in scenes of Annunciation.

Characters of lower mythology can also be shapeshifters. In lower mythology there was a special image of a werewolf, often acting as a false marriage partner, who can sometimes substitute for a deceased or absent groom, bride, husband, wife. In Komi mythology, a woman in the guise of an absent husband is the werewolf Kalyan, identifiable by horse teeth and cow hooves. The werewolf's sexual-erotic features are inseparable from those of the cannibal and are expressed in vampirism, or in the fact that the victim becomes thin and pale, making it possible to recognise the demon. Werewolves can be animals, plants, individual objects or spirits that take human form. According to Chinese beliefs, a werewolf (Jing) can be a long-lived animal (fox, snake, rat, tiger, etc.), an item long forgotten in the corner of the household, or the root of a plant (ginseng, mandrake, etc.). In East Slavic demonology, werewolves can be a fairy, house ghost, or devil, and can take the form of a relative or acquaintance. In Slavic folklore, a werewolf is a zmei who takes human form. The werewolf can also be an innate or acquired characteristic of the person. In European folklore, there was the image of a werewolf, a human werewolf, becoming a wolf, and in Chinese, the image of the fox werewolf.

Hinduism 

 At the lowest rung of the hierarchy of the Hinduism pantheon are forest and domestic spirits — patrons of cities, mountains, rivers, villages, houses, etc.

Iranian 

 The basis of Iranian mythology was the notion of confrontation between two mutually exclusive cosmic principles. The universal moral law of the universe Arta (Asha Vahishta), embodied in light and fire, was opposed to the Other, the embodiment of falsehood, darkness and ritual filth. 
 The camp of spiritual forces, gods and demons was divided into followers of Arta and Drugh. Dualism also divided the earthly world. 
 Iranian mythology is distinguished from other Indo-European traditions by its ethical colouring, the sharp dualism of the good spirits Ahura and yazats headed by Ahuramazda and dev, created and led by Angro-Mainu, who bring transgression, disease, death and seek to destroy the good into the world Ahuramazda created. 
 Amesha Spenta represent the seven supreme good spirits, they are surrounded by hosts of good spirits, the ahurs and yazat. 
 Above the devas is a triad: the spirit of lies (evil word) Druj, the spirit of evil thought Aka Manah, and the spirit of plunder (evil deed) Aishmoy.

Tajik 

 Tajik mythology is a combination of elements from Islamic mythology, Iranian mythology and the Tajik viewpoint itself. It developed in conjunction with the mythologies of neighbouring peoples — Turkic, especially Uzbeks, and Indian peoples. 
 As a result of the displacement of Islam, Tajik mythology covered primarily the sphere of lower mythology, with many demonological characters dating back to Iranian or Arabic. 
 Demons were conventionally divided into good ones (maloika, pari) and evil ones (Azhdahak, devas, albasti, ajina, shaitans, gul). It is believed that the presence of a person restrains evil demons who try to harm a person during the first forty days of his life. 
 In Tajik mythology, the great sorcerer Shokhi Moron ("the serpent king"), who lives in the clouds of the mountains, lord of mountain serpents and dragons, is known. 
 Fire is worshipped as one of the main elements of various rituals aimed at combating evil forces. 
 Associated with the cult of the ancestors is the veneration of feasts — patrons of crafts. With the establishment of Islam, many feasts were replaced by characters of Muslim mythology (Daud became the patron of metal work, Bibi-Fatima became the patroness of women's domestic work, etc.) and Muslim saints took up their functions (Bahauddin, Diwan-i Burkh), although some retain pre-Islamic names (such as the patron of agriculture Bobo-Dehcon). 
 The basis of cosmogonic beliefs is based on the images of Avesta "two great parents": mother-Earth and father-Sky, with whom, in particular, is connected with the image of grandfather-thunderer Kambar known to some groups of Tajiks. Spring and summer (the earth produces flowers and greenery) were connected with female figures, while winter and autumn were connected with male figures (the sky sends rains and snow that fertilise the earth). The notions of female personifications of the sky and thunder were preserved: mother sky, grandmother sky (momo-havo), grandmother thunder, cloud-cows spilling rain-milk on the earth.

Nuristan 

 Nuristan mythology at the lowest level includes demons and various spirits. The former are distinguished by their immense size and power.

Ancient Greek 

 In ancient Greek mythology the demons were usually represented as material, sensual beings. They possessed an ordinary body, although arising from different kinds of matter, they consisted of the four elements. 
 Ancient animistic demons were usually represented in a disorderly and disharmonious form. 
 Teratological myths tell of monsters symbolising the forces of the earth. Hesiod tells of the sky-born Uranus and earth-born Gaia Titans, Cyclopes and Hecatoncheires. Among the creatures of the earth were Erinyes, grey, bloody old women with dog-heads and with snakes in their loose hair, who keep the statutes of the earth and prosecute any offender against the earth and the rights of the maternal kin. Echidna and Typhon give birth to the dog Orpha, a copper-headed and fifty-headed bloodthirsty guardian Hades Cerberus, the Lernaean Hydra, the Chimera with three heads: lion, goat and snake, and the Sphinx, killing all who have not solved her riddles. Echidna and Orphus also gave birth to the Nemean lion. 
 Myxanthropic (combining human and animal traits) demons are represented by sirens (half-bird half-woman) and centaurs (half-horned half-human).

Norse 

 Such characters of Norse mythology include the Alves, nature spirits opposed to the gods Asam. Germanic mythology includes characters like elves, werewolves, the Wild Hunt (ghosts and evil spirits), Rübezal (mountain spirit), and Holda (Christmas character), etc.

Slavic 

 Slavic mythology includes fairy characters, presumably participants in ritual in their mythologized guise and leaders of classes of beings that belonged to the lowest level: Baba-Yaga, Koschei, Chudo-Yudo, forest king, water king, sea king. 
 Various classes of non-individualized, often non-anthropomorphic evil spirits and animals belonged to the lower mythology. They were associated with a mythological space from home to forest, swamp, etc. These included domovye, les, water, mermaid, vila, fever, marae, morae, kimory, sudichki among western Slavs; of animals — bear, wolf. The religious and mythological integrity of the Slavs was destroyed during their Christianization. 
 The higher mythology of the ancient Slavs is known in fragments, while more information is available on the lower mythology. 
 Indirectly, in all Slavic traditions is reflected frost, Morozko, a character of Slavic fairy tale and ceremonial folklore. 
 One of the later characters also known is Maslenitsa, a Russian anthropomorphic character to whom the name of the calendar holiday of the seeing off of winter and meeting of spring was transferred. 
 The character of the lower mythology of spring rituals was Yarilo, represented by the image of a girl dressed in white and on a white horse, in the doll of the Southern Slavs and in the effigy of the Russians.

Finno-Ugric 

 In Finno-Ugric mythology on the land, in addition to the deities (patrons of the trades), there lived spirits, masters of nature (leshie, water and others). 
 The Mordovian, Mari, Udmurt, Saamic and Estonian mythologies are characterized by spirits — mothers of nature and the elements: forest, water, fire, wind, etc. 
 The lower world was inhabited by evil spirits and the dead, along with the adversary of the god, the creator of evil. Until recently, Komi believed in spirits, the leshiy-vorsa and others. 
 Among the lower spirits of the Umdurts are the water vu-murt, numerous evil spirits keremets (luds; a reduced image of the enemy of god Inmar, Keremet, Lud), shaitans (whom Inmar pursues with lightning), peri (which may sometimes be servants of vorshud spirits), spirits of diseases (Kutyś or Myzh), and spirits of plagues (Cher and others). 
 A characteristic feature of Mordovian mythology are the images of spirits, the "mothers (ava)" of phenomena of nature, vegetation etc., including: Vir-ava (mother of forests), Ved-ava (mother of water), Varma-ava (mother of wind), Moda-ava (mother of earth), Tol-ava (mother of fire), Norov-ava (mother of fields), Yurt-ava (mother of houses), Nar-ava (mother of meadows), etc. There were also corresponding male characters, atya "fathers". 
 In Mari mythology, the lord of the afterlife Kiyamat, is the head of evil spirits (the god of death Azyren and others). The Mari patron god Kugurak or Kuguen has a large number of spirits in his subordination. Besides deities, some phenomena of nature are embodied by numerous spirits - "mothers" (avas): vyut-ava - water spirit, keche-ava - sun (patroness of a family), mardezh-ava - wind, shochyn-ava - fertility, tul-ava - fire, mlande-ava - earth, etc. Other categories of spirits are vodoji: kudo-vodyzh, the keeper of the family hearth, vyut-vodyzh, the master of water, kuryk-vodyzh, the mountain, etc. 
 The lowest level of the Khanty-Mansi pantheon consists of numerous spirits, in Khanty the lungs. The Mansi distinguish between guardian spirits and ancestor spirits - pupigi on the one hand, and evil spirits and disease personifications - kul - on the other. Of the demonic personages, the best known are the forest ogre giants - the menqui. The forests are inhabited also by the man-hating uchi (uchi, ochi). The human-friendly physiognomy of the menqes resembles that of the menqes. 
 The ideas about the different spirits and other inferior characters in Hungarian mythology are close to the corresponding images in the mythologies of the neighboring European peoples: ghosts, the spirit of leaders, various kinds of witches: Bosorkan, Lutsa - a ghostly being with the gift of foresight, Vashorru-baba - Yaba-yaga, etc.

Samoyedic 

 The lowest level of the pantheon of Samoyedic mythology includes many spirits subordinate to the main deities or serving shamans. 
 They fall into several categories: patron spirits embodied in cult objects (hehehe with the Nenets, kaha/kihu with the Enets, koika with the Nganasans, porke with the Selkups, kaigo with the Motor), spirits acting as assistants to the shaman (tadebzo with the Nenets, samadi with the Enets, Dyamada among Nganasans, one category of vines among Selkups), evil spirits and disease spirits doing the will of an evil god (ngyleka among Nenets, amuke (amuli) among Enets, ngamteru among Nganasans, some vines among Selkups). 
 Numerous demonic beings are usually hostile to humans and reside outside the pantheon. Unlike beings of the pantheon, they are mortal and can appear to any man. Nenets and Nganasans usually have one-legged, one-armed and one-eyed baruchi (barusi), Nenets have giants - ogres sudbya, forest witch parne (parngue, porngue), dangerous for children ngemunzi, sihirtia dwelling under the ground, feeding on the smell of food mal tenga ("corked ass"), two-faced sit sita, in Selkups - cannibal giants pune (puneguse, punekysa), multi-headed devils, etc.

Turkic 

 In mythology of the ancient (Orkhon) Türks, at the level of lower mythology, probably, was spread a belief in harmful spirits (el, ek), guardian-spirits kut (personification of a soul), spiritual masters of separate tracts and places . 
 The mediator between people and the spirit world was shaman (kam). The indications of sources on the existence of shamanism among the ancient Turkic population, Yenisei Kyrgyz, refer to the VIII-X centuries.

 The Mythology of the Turkic-speaking peoples of Asia Minor and Central Asia, Kazakhstan, Caucasus, Crimea and Western Siberia, who adopted Islam, is basically Muslim (Islamic). Islam gradually supplanted and destroyed the former mythology. A predominantly inferior mythology has been preserved, with no unified picture of the demonological characters of the peoples of the region. 
 Some local deities (Bobo-Dehkon, Chopan-ata, Burkut-baba, Korkut, etc.) have been transformed into images of Muslim saints. Images associated with Iranian mythology were preserved, the influence of which continued after conversion to Islam: azhdarha, dev, pari, Simurgh, chiltan, kyrk kyz, Bibi-Mushkusho, Bibi Se-shanbi, albasty (the latter is associated with Iranian mythology only partially). 
 Ancient Turkic low mythology was preserved in the images of ee - spirits-masters of various places among the Kyrgyz, Kazakhs, Turkmens and West Siberian Tatars, guardian-spirit of Kut among the Kyrgyz. Shamanism, widespread among Central Asians, has undergone significant changes. New images linked to the culture of the Iranian-speaking population of Central Asia appeared - spirits assisting the shaman pari and chiltans, and evil demons albasty and dev. In addition to them, shamans invoked Muslim prophets and saints.

 Mythology of the Tatars and Bashkirs is also Muslim in its basis. Some images of lower mythology have survived from pre-Muslim culture. Many characters of lower mythology are not known in most other Turkic mythologies: bichura, shurale, ubyr, spirits - masters of dwellings (oy iyase, abzar iyase, yort iyase) The spirits - owners of water su iyase, snake yuha (Yuvha), ghost oryak, personifications of diseases ulyat, chyachyak-anasy, etc.

Chuvash 

 In Chuvash mythology there are more than 200 deities and spirits of various ranks and functions, inhabiting the earth, the sky and the underworld. 
 In the service of the god of destiny are the messengers Pulech and Pichampar, the god - creator of bread is served by the spirits "founder of bread", "producer of bread", "keeper of bread", "grower", "producer of field fruits", etc., the god - creator of bees is served by the spirits "sending down bees' womb", "giving sweetness", "producing the bees' movement". The same functions of deities could be reproduced at different mythological levels. 
 So, in addition to the deities patronizing the house (Kilti tura) and cattle (Kartari tura), there was a house god (Khert-surt) and a spirit - a master of the barn (karta puse). The specific Chuvash characters of the inferior mythology include demonic beings Vulcan (sometimes Vopkan) causing epidemics and Khytam, which was a soul of the person who was not remembered after death, and it was considered the cause of the cattle death. 
 The figures in Tatar and Bashkir mythology are similar to the leshiy arsuri (corresponds to shurale), evil spirit vupar (close to ubyr), spirits "water mother" and "water father", shiv amashe and shiv ashshe (close to the "water grandfather" su babasa and "water mother" su anasy), "stable master" karta pute (corresponds to abzar myase), house ghost khert-surt (corresponds to oy iyase), etc. 
 Some images of Chuvash mythology go back to Islamic mythology: the patron spirit Ashapatman karchake (from the names Aishi, wife of Muhammad and his daughter Fatima), death spirit Esrel, angel Pireshti, devil shuittan and others. The spirit yereh (patron of the family and household) and possibly the spirits wut ami ("mother of fire") and wut asi ("father of fire").<ref>''Basilov V. N. Mythologies of the Turkic-speaking peoples of the Volga region // Myths of the peoples of the world. С. 1006-1007. </ref> 
 In Chuvash mythology are also known kiremet - a category of spirits into which the souls of worshipped people (ancestors, sorcerers, etc.) were transformed. Related names are found in other peoples: Kormos - the lower spirits of Altaic, Kurmush - the patron spirit of the house of Teleuts and others.

 Altai, Shorian, and Khakass 

 In the lower mythology of Altaic, Shorians and Khakasses, the images of yer-su spirits and the idea of the life force (soul) kut (hut) go back to the ancient Turkic tradition. 
 In Altai mythology the upper world is inhabited by principal good deities and spirits headed by Ulgen, the earth is inhabited by good deities Yer-su, clan deities (Toshi) and guardian spirits, the lower world is inhabited by monsters, spirits and deities harmful to people. Among the sources of clan cults was veneration of spirits - masters (ee) of mountains, valleys, glaciers, rivers, springs, etc. 
 The Khakass pantheon was less developed. The spirits were divided into "pure", good (aryg tos), and "black", evil (chobal tos, hara tos), with which the shaman fights. Numerous spirits are known as masters of places: mountains and taiga (tag-eezi), rivers (sug-eezi), lakes (kel-eezi), etc. 
 In Tuvinian''' mythology, the lord of the underworld Erlik-khan is the Erlik spirits (Erlikens, sometimes - Elchi). In the middle world there live spirits, on whom people's lives depend: good spirits eren, spirits - masters of places (very influential spirits of water and hearth, master of taiga, etc.), evil spirits - kara-buk (sometimes - beech, puk), aza (sometimes - möge, hi-yum), albys, shulbu (shulbus), kai-byn-ku, chetker, chylbyga and others.
 The spirits aza, shulbu and chetker are of Mongolian origin and princed by Buddhism (cf. ada, shimnus, shulmas). With the spirits of the upper and middle worlds (eerens) the "white" shamans communicated, with the spirits of the "dark" world the black ones.

Islamic 

 To the Islamic character gul goes back the image of the mythological creature gul-yabani in the mythologies of Turks, Azerbaijanis (also gulaybans, biaban-guli), Kyrgyz (gulbyaban) and Tajiks (gul, gul yovoni).

Buryat 

 The lowest order in Buryat shamanic mythology consists of anthropomorphic spirits: ada and anahai - the souls of sinful unborn women, dahuly and dahabari - the souls of illegitimate children, mu-shubun - the souls of girls who have never known love. 
 The least dangerous are the bokhandoi, the souls of those who have died a violent death. Buryat and Kalmyk mythology knows dzayachi, guardian spirits and grantors of good fortune. 
 In Buryat mythology there are zayans (zayanuuds), a class of lower spirits, like khans, ezhins and others, mediating between the heavenly gods and people, and including both good and evil characters. These spirits are replenished from among the dead shamans. 
 In Kalmyk low mythology there is a kun-mus ("man-mus") - a wool-covered humanoid giant.

Adyghe 

 Examples of inferior characters in Adyghe mythology are psykho-guasha, who looks like a beautiful woman and sometimes engages in intimate relations with men, and udy, witches and werewolves, who look like an ugly old woman.

Vietnamese 

 There are a lot of lower demons in Vietnamese mythology. Cults of local spirits - patrons of the communal house (dinh), spirits - patrons of crafts and professions - are common. 
 Perceptions of the lower mythology of the Viets were influenced by Buddhist beliefs. In the popular beliefs of the Viets, they have also become the spirits of the underwater world.

Taoist 

 The Taoist pantheon includes thousands of all sorts of immortals, saints, spirits, demons, heroes of local cults, characters of lower mythology and over 30 thousand spirits of the human body. 
 The Chinese syncretic mythology features spirits - servants of the underworld, numerous ghosts, shadows, demons, united by the term gui, etc.

Polynesian 

 In Polynesian mythology because information about the gods belonging to the higher pantheon is sacralized, they occupy an important place in incantation-prayers, hymns, genealogies and lists-"catalogues", but appear much less frequently in narratives. However, at the lower levels of the hierarchy there are characters with the same names (e.g. Hiro) who appear as characters in narratives, legends and tales. 
 At lower levels of Micronesian mythology are characters with the names of gods, for example, Puntan, the god and man of great cunning in chamorro mythology, Nareau, demiurge and trickster. 
 A larger role than the gods in Micronesian mythology is played by demigods, spirits and heroes. There are known earthly and heavenly spirits, good ("their") and evil ("alien"), such as the bladek and delep of the Palau.

Europe 

 Such creatures as vampires, turners, witches belong to the lower mythology of Europe, dwarves, mermaids, incubus, succubus, fairy, Lamia, mara, undines, etc., originating in various traditions (ancient, Germanic, Slavic, etc.), but which have entered into the worldwide folklore. 
 One of the rituals of lower mythology of the peoples of Europe is Carnival, an anthropomorphic embodiment of the calendar festival of farewell to winter, celebrated on the eve of the Great Lent.

See also 
 Demonology
 Folk religion
 Legendary creature

References

Literature 

 Ames М. Buddha and the dancing goblins. «American Anthropologist». 1964. V. 66, № 1
 Leach E. R. Pulleyar and the Lord Buddha
Mythology
Mythological characters
Pages with unreviewed translations